Aroaqui (Aroaki) is an extinct Arawakan language of Brazil that was spoken in the lower Rio Negro region, probably on the banks of the Cuieiras River. Some Aroaqui groups were also located around the mouth of the Amazon River near Macapá.

A word list of Aroaqui was collected by Johann Natterer (1832) in Airão.

Aroaqui and Parawana are closely related, and may be the same language.

References

Arawakan languages
Languages of Brazil